Strathblane is a rural locality in the local government area (LGA) of Huon Valley in the South-east LGA region of Tasmania. The 2016 census recorded a population of 125 for the state suburb of Strathblane.

History 
Strathblane was gazetted as a locality in 1966.

Geography
The waters of the D'Entrecasteaux Channel form the eastern boundary, and Port Espérance part of the northern.

Road infrastructure 
Route A6 (Huon Highway) runs through from north to south.

References

Towns in Tasmania
Localities of Huon Valley Council